The International Defence Industry Exhibition is the largest trade fair event dedicated to military equipment in Central and Eastern Europe. Established in 1993, it is currently held every year at Targi Kielce in Kielce, Poland. The exhibition brings together over 600 exhibitors from over 30 countries and attracts more than 19,000 visitors annually. The MSPO showcases the latest military technologies, armaments and products for the army. This four-day trade fair is attended by the professionals, who represent Polish Army, the Police, the Ministry of National Defence, the Ministry of Interior and Administration, and Polish Government. The event is visited by the world’s largest defense industry powers, such as: Austria, Belgium, Czech Republic, Denmark, Finland, France, Germany, Great Britain, India, Israel, Italy, Korea, Norway, Poland, Russia, Spain, Sweden, Switzerland, The Netherlands, Turkey, Ukraine, and the United States.
The best products showcased at the event are awarded the annual Award of the RP President, as well as the Defender Awards and Special Commendations of the Minister of National Defence.
The International Defence Industry Exhibition is held together with the International Logistics Fair LOGISTYKA. LOGISTYKA displays wide range of products, ranging from uniforms, food products and equipment used for meal preparation to storage and transport, medical equipment, communications and IT systems and electronic engineering solutions.

The International Defence Industry Exhibition is regarded to be the third largest European arms fair, after Eurosatory and DSEI.

Number of exhibitors over the years
 1993 – 85 exhibitors from 5 countries
 2002 – 237 exhibitors from 20 countries
 2003 – 272 exhibitors from 22 countries
 2004 – 283 exhibitors from 22 countries
 2007 – 364 exhibitors from 21 countries
 2012 – 400 exhibitors from 29 countries
 ...
 2022 - 613 exhibitors from 33 countries.

National Exhibitions
Since 2004, the International Defence Industry Exhibition has been accompanied by variety of National Exhibitions. Every year different country presents their military trends;

 2004 – Germany
 2005 – France
 2006 – Israel
 2007 – United States
 2008 – Sweden
 2009 – Visegrád Group|V4 Group Countries
 2010 – Great Britain
 2012 – Italy
 2013 - Turkey
 2014 - France
2015 – Norway
2016 – lack
2017 – South Korea
2018 - lack
2019 – USA
2020 - Great Britain
2021 – lack
2022 - Turkey

Branch range
Every year, thousands of visitors attend International Defence Industry Exhibition to get to know the latest innovations in the following exhibition sectors:
 Armoured equipment
 Classical armament, missiles and explosive materials
 Equipment and materials for chemical services
 Aviation and air defence armament and equipment
 Naval armament and equipment
 Special equipment for Police
 Special equipment for Border Guards
 Extinguishing and rescue equipment
 Transport equipment (wheeled, tracked and amphibian), also for special use
 Radio- and opto-electronic equipment; Communication and information technologies; Metrology equipment
 Defence infrastructure equipment
 Engineering equipment
 Groceries and equipment for meal preparing, storage and transportation
 Uniform articles
 Fuels, exploitation liquids and equipment for their distribution and storage
 Medical equipment and materials, individual first aid kits
 Subassemblies, equipment and systems of people and property protection

Targi Kielce
Targi Kielce is one of the two leaders on Polish exhibition market that offers 90,000 m2 of the exhibition space, including seven exhibition halls of 36000m2 equipped with all state-of-the-art utilities.
Annually, Targi Kielce is the organizer of over 70 conferences, concerts and sports events. Among most important events organized by Targi Kielce are trade shows, including the following: PLASTPOL, MSPO, AUTOSTRADA-POLSKA, SACROEXPO and AGROTECH.

References

External links
 Targi Kielce
 MSPO reports
 Międzynarodowy Salon Przemysłu Obronnego
 expochart.com about MSPO
 MSPO inauguration

Arms fairs
Trade fairs in Poland